The 2009–10 Scottish Football League Third Division (also known as the 2009–10 Irn-Bru Scottish Football League Third Division for sponsorship reasons) was the 15th season in the format of ten teams in the fourth-tier of Scottish football. The season started on 8 August 2009 and ended on 1 May 2010. Livingston F.C. finished top and were promoted alongside Forfar Athletic as play-off winners.

Teams

Promotion and relegation from 2008–09

Dumbarton as champions of the 2008–09 season were directly promoted to the 2009–10 Scottish Second Division. They were replaced by Stranraer who finished bottom of the 2008–09 Scottish Second Division.

A second promotion place was available via a play-off tournament between the ninth-placed team of the 2008–09 Scottish Second Division, Queen's Park, and the sides ranked second, third and fourth in the 2008–09 Scottish Third Division, Cowdenbeath, East Stirlingshire and Stenhousemuir respectively. The play off was won by Stenhousemuir who defeated Cowdenbeath in the final. Queen's Park were therefore relegated. However, Livingston F.C. were demoted to the Third Division, leading to an extra promotion being awarded. Cowdenbeath as runners-up of the play-off final were therefore promoted.

Relegated from First Division to Third Division

Livingston

Relegated from Second Division to Third Division

Stranraer
Queen's Park (via playoffs)

Promoted from Third Division to Second Division

Dumbarton
Stenhousemuir (via playoffs)
Cowdenbeath (losing play-off finalists, promoted due to Livingston's demotion to the Third Division)

Stadia and locations

A.East Stirlingshire ground shared with Stenhousemuir.

League table

Results
Teams play each other four times in this league. In the first half of the season each team plays every other team twice (home and away) and then do the same in the second half of the season.

First half of season

Second half of season

References

External links
2009-2010 Scottish Third Division at Soccerway

Scottish Third Division seasons
3
4
Scot